John Moriarty may refer to:

John Moriarty (Attorney General) (1855–1915), Irish lawyer and judge
John Moriarty (conductor) (born 1930), American conductor and stage director
John Moriarty (writer) (1938–2007), Irish writer and philosopher
John Kundereri Moriarty (born 1938), Australian footballer and artist

See also
Geoffrey John Jack Moriarty (1901–1980), Australian rules player
Johnny Moriarty (born 1945), Irish retired hurling goalkeeper